Mahi Way is an Indian comedy drama television series, which premiered on Sony Entertainment Television on 2 January 2010 and ran till 18 June 2010. The series is written by Devika Bhagat, directed by Nupur Asthana, and produced by Aditya Chopra.

Plot 
The short series tells the story of an overweight chubby girl, Mahi, who is looking for perfect love but insists on being herself rather than changing herself to conform to socially defined narrow standards of beauty.

Mahi Talwar is a 25-year-old single woman who writes an advice column in a Delhi-based fashion magazine where she is always looked down upon but she aspires to be a serious journalist and more confident with her colleagues. She comes from a loud Punjabi family, pampered by her father but sidelined by her mother and beautiful elder sister Anjali. She has a crush on a handsome businessman named Ishan Singh Ahluwalia and tries every way to get closer to him with the help of her friends Sid and Roshni.

Cast
Pushtiie Shakti as Mahi Talwar
Viraf Patel as Shiv Deshraj
Siddhant Karnick as Ishaan Singh Ahluwalia
Amrita Raichand as Anjali Suri, Mahi's elder sister
Sharon Prabhakar as Ramona Kohli, chief editor of the magazine
Mark Farokh Parekh as Siddharth Kanwar, Mahi's friend
Monica Khanna as Roshni Sen, Mahi's best friend
Faezeh Jalali as Sona, Mahi's colleague at the magazine
Reema Ramchandani as Mona, Mahi's colleague at the magazine
Suparna Marwah as Ranjita Talwar
Ikhlaque Khan as Alok Talwar
Alka Pradhan as Mahi's Grandmother
Kanika Dang as Leela
Aditya Pandey as Ankur Talwar, Mahi's younger brother
 Olivier Lafont as Dev Gupta
Sharad Jagtiani as Raghu Suri

References

Sony Entertainment Television original programming
Indian television soap operas
2010 Indian television series debuts
2010 Indian television series endings